The Bacardi Bowl was a college football bowl game played seven times in Havana, Cuba, at Almandares Park and La Tropical Stadium. The games were also referred to as the Rhumba Bowl and were the foremost event of Cuba’s annual National Sports Festival. The first five occurrences matched an American college team (all from the Deep South) against Cuban universities or athletic clubs. The 1937 game featured two American universities. The 1946 game—sometimes considered the first of the Cigar Bowl games—also matched an American college team (from the Deep South) against a Cuban university.

Game results

 game was not completed

Notable Bacardi Bowl games

1907: LSU vs. University of Havana
The first Bacardi Bowl in 1907 matched Louisiana State University against the University of Havana.

1912: Florida vs. Cuban Athletic Club
The 1912 Bacardi Bowl was scheduled as a two-game series in Havana featuring the Florida Gators against squads from two different Cuban athletic clubs. It was Florida's first experience with postseason football.

The first game was held on Christmas Day, and the Gators defeated the Vedado Athletic Club 28–0. The second game, which pitted the Gators against the Cuban Athletic Club of Havana a few days later, was never finished. Florida head coach George E. Pyle realized during the first quarter that the game was being officiated using college football's pre-1906 rules, and while discussing this issue with the officials, he discovered that the head referee was the former coach of his opponent. Feeling that playing under those conditions was neither fair nor safe, Pyle pulled his team off the field and was promptly arrested for violating a Cuban law prohibiting a game's suspension after spectators' money had been collected. A trial was scheduled and Pyle was released on bail that evening, at which point he and the Gators quickly boarded a steamship for Tampa, an escape which caused the coach to be branded a "fugitive from justice" by Cuban authorities.

Bacardi Bowl officials declared that Florida had forfeited the game and listed it as a 1–0 win for the Cuban Athletic Club, while the University of Florida declared the contest a 1-0 forfeit win for the Gators. In later years, both the complete and incomplete games were dropped from the university's official football record, and the Gators' trip to the Bacardi Bowl is not listed among the program's official bowl game appearances.

1937: Auburn vs. Villanova
Auburn’s bowl history began with the 1937 game before 15,000 to 18,000 spectators when the Tigers and Villanova tied, 7–7. This game marked the first time that two American universities played a game on foreign soil. An Auburn drive in the first quarter stalled on the 10-yard line where the Wildcats took over on downs. After a Villanova punt, Auburn running back Billy Hitchcock broke loose around left end and rambled 40 yards for the Tigers' only score. The score at the half was Auburn 7, Villanova 0.

Auburn stopped a Villanova drive on its own 12-yard line during the third quarter but couldn’t get field position. Villanova was able to tie the score when they blocked an Auburn quick kick and the ball bounced into the endzone where Wildcat lineman Matthews Kuber fell on it for the score. The extra point tied the game.

The game was played in a revolutionary atmosphere. Fulgencio Batista, the dictator who would be overthrown by Fidel Castro 22 years later, had just assumed power. The game was almost canceled because Batista’s picture was not in the game program. A quick trip to the printer saved the Bacardi Bowl.  The December 22, 1963, issue of the Florence Times-Tri-Cities Daily has a detailed account of former Auburn player Frank Hamm's recollections of this game.

Other college football games against Cuban teams
Additional college football games were played in Cuba, or in the United States against Cuban teams, from 1906 to 1956.

Italics denote a tie game

Other American football games in Cuba

The last organized American football game in Cuba was in 1958, when a semipro league featuring teams of Cubans and Americans played. 

It would be another 45 years until Cuba would host a football game, this time featuring two American teams: in 2003, Bonita Vista High School and La Jolla High School from San Diego played at Pan-American Stadium. Due to the presence of metal boxes beyond the end lines, which was deemed a safety hazard, both coaches and the referee agreed to reduce the length of the field to 90 yards. In what was billed as the "Havana Classic", Bonita Vista defeated La Jolla, 31–22, in front of 400 people.

See also
 List of college bowl games
 List of college football games played outside the United States

References

External links
December 1912 game program

Defunct college football bowls
American football in Cuba
1907 establishments in Cuba
Recurring sporting events established in 1907